The Beriev Be-2 (originally designated KOR-1) was a two-seat reconnaissance seaplane built for the Soviet Navy shortly before World War II. It was designed to replace the Navy's obsolete license-produced Heinkel He 55 aircraft operating from warships and shore bases.

Design and development
The Be-2 was an all-metal biplane floatplane, with two open cockpits in tandem for the pilot and observer. The wings were braced, but designed to be folded back for storage on a warship. The float arrangement consisted of  a large central float, with two smaller floats on the wings.

From the outset, Be-2 design exhibited serious handling difficulties and maintenance problems. However, due to the lack of a suitable alternative, the design was placed into production. A total of around 12 serial aircraft were produced. By June 1941, six KOR-1 were in the Baltic, five were in the Black Sea Fleet Air Force.

Operational history
As problems with stability on the water while taxiing, and with maintenance of the engine were never really resolved,  that in practice, the Be-2 was restricted to training and secondary roles, and was more often deployed from land than from warships as originally planned. In addition, delays with updating the Navy's cruisers meant that suitable catapults were not installed until about 1939.

With the outbreak of war with Germany, all attempts to deploy the troublesome aircraft from ships were finally abandoned. During the early years of the war, they served as shore-based reconnaissance and search/rescue aircraft on the Baltic, and with their float undercarriage replaced by wheels, some were pressed into service as strike aircraft during the Battle of Sevastopol. They were withdrawn from service in 1942.

Operators
  
 Soviet Naval Aviation

Specifications

See also

Notes

References

 
 

Biplanes
Single-engined tractor aircraft
1930s Soviet military reconnaissance aircraft
Floatplanes
Be-0002
Aircraft first flown in 1936